Konche is a village in Momchilgrad Municipality, Kardzhali Province, southern Bulgaria.

References

Villages in Kardzhali Province